Ice and the Sky (also known as Antarctica: Ice and Sky) is a 2015 French documentary film directed by Luc Jacquet about the work of Claude Lorius, who began studying Antarctic ice in 1957, and, in 1965, was the first scientist to be concerned about global warming. The film was selected to close the 2015 Cannes Film Festival.

References

External links
 
 

2015 films
2015 documentary films
French documentary films
2010s French-language films
Documentary films about global warming
Documentary films about Antarctica
Films directed by Luc Jacquet
2010s French films